Tipredane (developmental code name SQ-27239) is a synthetic glucocorticoid corticosteroid which was never marketed.

References

Secondary alcohols
Fluoroarenes
Glucocorticoids
Ketones
Organosulfur compounds
Pregnanes
Abandoned drugs